Khudair Abdul Amir (1934–Present) is an Iraqi writer and novelist. His novel Rumuzun ʿAṣriya (Modern Symbols) was chosen by the Arab Writers Union in the 20th century among the best 100 Arabic novels.

About The Author 
Khudair Abdul Amir continued his secondary school studies in Baghdad. He published his first story in Al-Shaab newspaper in 1956. Also, he was employed in the department of imports, before moving to the ministry of communications. He also was a secretary for Al-Ṭaliʿa Magazine editorial from 1979-1984. He also was the magazine’s editorial board director in 1984-1990. In 1993, he was a proof-reader in the department of general cultural affairs in Al-Aqlam magazine. Finally, he is a member of the Author and Writers Union in Iraq.

His Works

Novels 

 Laisa Thimmatu Amalin Li Gilgamesh (There is No Hope for Gilgamesh) (1971)
 Rumuzun ʿAṣriya (Modern Symbols) (1977)
 Hatha Aj-Janibu Minal Madina (The Side of The City) (1984)
 At-Ṭuruqul Muwḥesha (Savage Ways) (1999)
 Ḥob Wa Ḥarb (Love and War) (2000)

Other Writings 

 Ḥamamu Al-Saʿada (Pigeon of Happiness) (Short story collection), 1964
 Ar-Raḥil (The Leaving) (Short story collection), 1968
 ʿAwdatul Rajulil Mahzuz (Return of The Shaken Man) (Short story collection), 1970
 Kanat Hunaka Ḥikayatun (There Was A Tale) (Short story collection), 1974
 Khayma Lil ʿAam Ḥasan (Uncle Hasan's Tent) (Short story collection), 1974
 Al-Farrara (The Runaway) (Stories), 1979
 Al-Layla Al-Oula Fi Bayti Nasr (The First Night at Nasr's House) (Fictional narratives), 1988
 Nujumun Fi Samaa’il Nahar (Stars in The Morning Sky) (Stories), 1985
 ʿĀshiqāni Min Baghdad (Two Lovers From Baghdad) (Stories), 1987
 Al-Aswad Wal Abyad (Black and White) (Stories), 1990
 Aṣ-Ṣilṣal (The Clay) (Short story collection), 1996
 Al-Ashbaḥ (Ghosts) (Short story collection), 2001

Prizes & Awards 
Arab Journalism Award from Arab Journalism Prize in the United Arab Emirates in 2015.

References 

Arabic literature
Iraqi writers
Iraqi literature
1934 births
Living people